The 2016 Grand Prix Zagreb Open was a Greco-Roman wrestling event held in Zagreb, Croatia, between 23–24 January 2016.

Medal table

Team ranking

Greco-Roman

Participating nations

87 competitors from 12 nations participated.
 (2)
 (5)
 (1)
 (17)
 (6)
 (1)
 (13)
 (17)
 (12)
 (2)
 (2)
 (9)

References 

Grand Prix Zagreb Open
Grand Prix Zagreb Open
International wrestling competitions hosted by Croatia
Sport in Zagreb
Wrestling in Croatia
Grand Prix Zagreb Open